Mixed Flats is a 1915 American silent comedy film featuring Oliver Hardy.

Plot

Cast
 Ben Walker as Jack Robbins
 Oliver Hardy as Bob White
 Frances Ne Moyer as Mrs. Robbins
 Mabel Paige as Slavey
 Nellie Farron as Mrs. Blake
 Ed Lawrence as Minister Blake
 William H. Hopkins as A Janitor

See also
 List of American films of 1915
 Oliver Hardy filmography

External links

1915 films
1915 short films
American silent short films
American black-and-white films
1915 comedy films
Silent American comedy films
American comedy short films
1910s American films